Microrhopala is a genus of tortoise beetles and hispines in the family Chrysomelidae. There are about 18 described species in Microrhopala.

Species
These 18 species belong to the genus Microrhopala:

 Microrhopala arizonica Schaeffer, 1906
 Microrhopala beckeri Weise, 1905
 Microrhopala ciliata Weise, 1911
 Microrhopala columbica Weise, 1911
 Microrhopala erebus (Newman, 1840)
 Microrhopala excavata (Olivier, 1808)
 Microrhopala floridana Schwarz, 1878
 Microrhopala hecate (Newman, 1840)
 Microrhopala inermis Staines, 2006
 Microrhopala moseri Uhmann, 1940
 Microrhopala perforata Baly, 1864
 Microrhopala pulchella Baly, 1864
 Microrhopala rileyi S. Clark, 1983
 Microrhopala rubrolineata (Mannerheim, 1843)
 Microrhopala sallei Baly, 1864
 Microrhopala unicolor Champion, 1894
 Microrhopala vittata (Fabricius, 1798) (goldenrod leaf miner)
 Microrhopala xerene (Newman, 1838)

References

Further reading

External links

 

Cassidinae
Articles created by Qbugbot